The Music Victoria Awards (previously known as The Age EG Awards and The Age Music Victoria Awards) are an annual awards night celebrating music from the Australian state of Victoria. They commenced in 2006 and are awarded in Melbourne Music Week between October and December. The awards were initially an exclusively online public voted awards, changing in 2013.

From 2020, to be eligible, all nominations must be taken from music released between July of the previous year to June of the current year, to bring the awards in line with the past financial year.

History and eligibility
Patrick Donovan started the awards in 2006 to celebrate The Age Entertainment Guide's 21st anniversary. The 2006 awards were a retrospective ceremony and winners came from the past 21 years. The event occurred at the Prince Bandroom, St Kilda.

Donovan ran the awards for six years as The Age EG Music Awards before leaving The Age in 2011. Mary Mihelakos ran them in 2012 and 2013, and Belinda Collins from 2014. In 2018, Laura Imbruglia produced the event and a range of new changes were introduced, including significant category changes. 2018 was the final year of the partnership with The Age. Since 2019, the awards continue titled Music Victoria Awards.

To be eligible, at least 50% of the act has been living in Victoria for the last two years, or uses Melbourne as a home base. Solo artists must reside in Victoria to be eligible (residency of backing band is not considered).

Award categories have changed over the years, and consist of public voted, industry voted awards and Legend/Hall of Fame inductions.

From 2012 to 2014, the genre specific categories were awarded in October and the public voted awards in November, however, these have been merged into one event since the 2015 event. In 2021, The Awards will introduce a new category to represent the achievements and contributions of disabled and deaf musicians.

The event was held at Prince Bandroom, St Kilda (2006-2011), Billboard (2012-2013), 170 Russell (2014-2017) and The Melbourne Recital Centre (2018-present).

Awards by year
To see the full article for a particular year, please click on the year link.

2006-2012

2013-present

References

External links

 

 
Australian music awards
Awards established in 2006
2006 establishments in Australia
Annual events in Australia
Recurring events established in 2006